Aidan Fuller (born June 8, 2003), known professionally as 347aidan, is a Canadian rapper from Cambridge, Ontario. He is most noted as a two-time Juno Award nominee at the Juno Awards of 2022, receiving nods for Breakthrough Artist of the Year and Fan Choice.

Career 
Fuller began releasing music to SoundCloud in 2018, and broke through to wider attention in early 2021 when his single "Dancing in My Room" broke through as a popular TikTok trend. The song was subsequently a nominee for the 2021 SOCAN Songwriting Prize.

He followed up in the fall with Chasing Harmony, his first EP.

On May 25, 2022, 347aidan was featured on American rapper Sleepy Hallow's single "Die Young".

References

21st-century Canadian rappers
Canadian male rappers
People from Cambridge, Ontario
Living people
2003 births